Idrettslaget Flint is a Norwegian sports club from Søndre Slagen, Tønsberg, Vestfold. It has sections for association football, team handball, volleyball, table tennis and track and field. Flint is the largest sports club in Vestfold, and the club introduced a new clubhouse in May 2015. The clubhouse is located on Løveid by Tolvsrød, with associated sports facilities and courts. In addition, a number of local grass and gravel courts, school gyms, and Slagenhallen (next to Presterød school) are used.

The club was founded on 28 April 1917.

Football
The club currently plays in 3. divisjon, the fourth tier of the Norwegian football league system.

On 10 October 2001, the football section cooperated with 19 other teams in the region to form an elite umbrella team, FK Tønsberg. Nonetheless, the men's football team was unaffected by the FK Tønsberg founding. On 5 November 2019, Flint announced John Arne Riise as their new head coach.

Handball
The women's handball team, Flint Tønsberg have been playing in Postenligaen since 2010, having won the First Division, the second tier, in the 2009–10 season, and again from 2020 after being relegated.

References

External links 
 Flint Esso Arena - Nordic Stadiums
 Official football site 
 Handball site 

Football clubs in Norway
Norwegian handball clubs
Sport in Vestfold og Telemark
Tønsberg
Association football clubs established in 1917
Sports clubs established in 1917
1917 establishments in Norway
Multi-sport clubs in Norway